The Passio secundum Joannem or St John Passion, BWV 245, is a Passion or oratorio by Johann Sebastian Bach, the older of the surviving Passions by Bach. It was written during his first year as director of church music in Leipzig and was first performed on April 7, 1724, at Good Friday Vespers at the St. Nicholas Church.

The structure of the work falls in two halves, intended to flank a sermon. The anonymous libretto draws on existing works (notably by Barthold Heinrich Brockes) and is compiled from recitatives and choruses narrating the Passion of Christ as told in the Gospel of John, ariosos and arias reflecting on the action, and chorales using hymn tunes and texts familiar to a congregation of Bach's contemporaries. Compared with the St Matthew Passion, the St John Passion has been described as more extravagant, with an expressive immediacy, at times more unbridled and less "finished".

The work is most often heard today in the 1739–1749 version (never performed during Bach's lifetime). Bach first performed the oratorio in 1724 and revised it in 1725, 1732, and 1749, adding several numbers. "", a 1725 replacement for the opening chorus, found a new home in the 1736 St Matthew Passion but several arias from the revisions are found only in the appendices to modern editions.

First performance 
Originally Bach intended that the St John Passion would be first performed in the St. Thomas Church in Leipzig, but due to a last-minute change by the music council, it was first performed on Good Friday (as observed by German Protestants) of 1724 in the St. Nicholas Church, shortly after Bach's 39th birthday. Bach quickly agreed to their desire to move the service to St. Nicholas Church, but pointed out that the booklet was already printed, that there was no room available and that the harpsichord needed some repair, all of which, however, could be attended to at little cost; but he requested that a little additional room be provided in the choir loft of St. Nicholas Church, where he planned to place the musicians needed to perform the music. He also asked that the harpsichord be repaired. The council agreed and sent a flyer announcing the new location to all the people around Leipzig. The council made the arrangements requested by Bach regarding the harpsichord and space needed for the choir.

Musical architecture and sources 

The St John Passion is written for a four-part choir with soloists, as well as an instrumental ensemble of strings and basso continuo with pairs of flauti traversi and oboes, the latter both doubling on oboe da caccia. For special colors Bach also used lute, viola d'amore and viola da gamba, instruments that were already old-fashioned at the time.

In present-day performances the part of Jesus is often given to one bass soloist, Pilate and the bass arias to another. Some tenors sing the Evangelist – a very demanding part – and the arias. The smaller parts (Peter, Maid, Servant) are sometimes performed by choir members.

Bach followed chapters 18 and 19 of the Gospel of John in the Luther Bible, and the tenor Evangelist follows exactly the words of that bible. The compiler of the additional poetry is unknown. Models are the Brockes Passion and a Johannes-Passion by Christian Heinrich Postel. The first scene is in the Kidron Valley, and the second in the palace of the high priest Kaiphas. Part Two shows three scenes, one with Pontius Pilate, one at Golgatha, and the third finally at the burial site. The dramatic argument between Pilate, Jesus, and the crowd is not interrupted by reflective elements but a single central chorale, #22 (note that this particular numbering is only used by the NBA).

Bach followed the Gospel of John but added two lines from the Gospel of Matthew, the crying of Peter and the tearing of the veil in the temple (in Version I, this second line was replaced by the line from the Gospel of Mark).

He chose the chorales:
 "Herzliebster Jesu, was hast du verbrochen" by Johann Heermann (1630), verse 6 for movement 3, verses 7 & 8 for 17,
 "Vater unser im Himmelreich" by Martin Luther (1539), verse 4 for movement 5,
 "" by Paul Gerhardt (1647), verses 3 & 4 for movement 11,
 "Jesu Leiden, Pein und Tod" by Paul Stockmann (1633), verse 10 for movement 14, verse 20 for 28, the last verse for 32,
 "Christus, der uns selig macht" by Michael Weiße (1531), verse 1 for movement 15, verse 8 for 37,
 "Valet will ich dir geben" by Valerius Herberger (1613), verse 3 for movement 26,
 "Herzlich lieb hab ich dich, o Herr" by Martin Schalling (1571), verse 3 for movement 40.

For the words of the aria "Ach, mein Sinn" (#13), Bach used an adaptation of a 1675 poem by Christian Weise, "Der weinende Petrus".

For the central chorale (#22) "Durch dein Gefängnis, Gottes Sohn, muß uns die Freiheit kommen" ("Through Your prison, Son of God, must freedom come to us) Bach adapted the words of an aria from the Johannes-Passion of Christian Heinrich Postel (1700) and used the melody of "Mach's mit mir, Gott, nach deiner Güt" by Johann Hermann Schein. The architecture of Part Two shows symmetry around this movement, the music of the preceding chorus #21f "Wir haben ein Gesetz" corresponds to #23b "Lässest du diesen los", the demand #21d "Kreuzige ihn!" is repeated in an intensified way in #23d "Weg, weg mit dem, kreuzige ihn!", #21b "Sei gegrüßet, lieber Jüdenkönig" reappears as #25b "Schreibe nicht: der Jüden König".

Versions 

Researchers have discovered that Bach revised his St John Passion several times before producing a final version in the 1740s. Alternate numbers that Bach introduced in 1725 but later removed can be found in the appendix to scores of the work, such as that of the Neue Bach-Ausgabe (and heard in the recording by Emmanuel Music directed by Craig Smith, cited below).

The St John Passion was not Bach's first passion. While he was working as Konzertmeister (1714–1717) in Weimar, Bach possibly wrote a Passion, known as the Weimarer Passion, but it is now lost. Sometimes while listening to the St John Passion today one can sense an older feel to some of the music, and some scholars believe that those portions are the surviving parts of the Weimar Passion. Unlike the St Matthew Passion, to which Bach made very few and insignificant changes, the St John Passion was subject to several major revisions. The version most familiar to us today is not the original version from 1724, but rather the version of 1739–1749. In the 1724 version, the Recitative Movement No. 33 reads "Und die Vorhang im Tempel zerriß in zwei Stück; von oben an bis unten aus." (Mark 15, 33) and was in 3 measures. From 1725 on, this was replaced by the more familiar 7-measure quote from Matthew 27: 51–52 (except in the 3rd version, in which this was taken out altogether).

In 1725, Bach replaced the opening and closing choruses and added three arias (BWV 245a-c) while cutting one (Ach, mein Sinn) from the original version. The opening chorus was replaced by O Mensch, bewein dein Sünde groß, which was later transposed and reused at the end of part one of the St Matthew Passion. The closing chorale was replaced by a brilliant setting of "Christe, du Lamm Gottes", taken from the cantata Du wahrer Gott und Davids Sohn, BWV 23. The three new arias are not known to have been reused.

In the 1730s, Bach revised the St John Passion again, restoring the original opening chorus, removing the final Chorale (thus ending the work with the choral Movement No. 39), and removing the three new arias. He also excised the two interpolations from the Gospel of Matthew that appeared in the work, probably due to objections by the ecclesiastical authorities. The first of these he simply removed; he composed a new instrumental sinfonia in lieu of the second. He also inserted an aria to replace the still-missing Ach, mein Sinn. Neither the aria nor the sinfonia has been preserved. Overall, Bach chose to keep the biblical text, and inserted Lutheran hymn verses so that he could return the work to its liturgical substance.

In 1749, he reverted more or less to the original of 1724, making only slight changes to the orchestration, most notably replacing the by-then almost obsolete viola d'amore with muted violins. Also, Bach's orchestra for this piece would have been very delicate in nature because he called for many gamba strings.

In the summer of 1815, Bach's Passions began to be studied once again. Parts of the St John Passion were being rehearsed and the St Matthew Passion was soon to follow. Fred Wolle, with his Choral Union of 1888 at the Moravian town of Bethlehem, Pennsylvania, was the first to perform the St John Passion in the Americas. This spurred a revival of Bach's choral music in the New World.

Congregational use 

While writing the St John Passion, Bach intended to retain the congregational spirit of the worship service. The text for the body of the work is taken from the Gospel of John chapters 18 and 19. To augment these chapters, which he summarized in the music, Bach used an elaborate body of commentary consisting of hymns, which were often called chorales, and arias. He adhered to Martin Luther's translation of the Bible and made no noticeable modifications. Bach proved that the sacred opera as a musical genre did not have to become shallow in liturgical use by remaining loyal to the cantus firmus and the scriptural word. He did not want the Passion taken as a lesser sacred concert. The text for the opening prayer, "Herr, unser Herrscher, dessen Ruhm", as well as the arias, chorales and the penultimate chorus "Ruht wohl, ihr heiligen Gebeine", come from various other sources. Two recitative passages, the first dealing with Peter's weeping after his betrayal and the second portraying the temple veil's ripping during the crucifixion, do not appear in the Gospel of John, but the Gospel of Matthew.

A modern example originating in Communist Hungary demonstrates the congregational character of St John Passion. In the early 1950s musicians were allowed to play church music only in the frame of liturgy. However, the St John Passion is an almost complete Lutheran liturgy, focused on the Evangelium. Hence, by inserting four missing features, the whole Passion could be performed as if it were part of the liturgy.
There would have been no applause, either at the beginning or at the end. The Passion contains quite a few chorales that were in regular use in worship. The congregation and the audience, however, remained silent.

Highlights 
 
 'opening chorus': "Herr, unser Herrscher ..." ("Lord, our master, ..."). There is an orchestral intonation of 36 bars before the explosive entrance of the chorus. Each of these bars is a single stress of lower tones, weakening till the end of the bar. These bass beats are accompanied by the remaining instruments of higher tones, by legato singing the prospective theme. The last six bars of the orchestral intro produce a robust crescendo, ending with the loud shouts of "Herr, Herr, Herr!" in the first bars of the chorus. Soon, after the first part of the theme, comes the triple shout again, but this time, at the end of the bars, as a contra answer for the corresponding orchestral deep stresses at the beginning of the bars. Finally, the entire A section is repeated."Herr, unser Herrscher" and "O Mensch, bewein dein Sünde groß" are very different in character. The latter is full of torment in its text, but a serenely majestic piece of music. "Herr, unser Herrscher" sounds as if it has chains of dissonance between the two oboes and the turmoil of the roiling sixteenth notes in the strings. Especially, when they invade the bass, it is full of anguish and therefore it characterizes the St John Passion.
 commenting arias: The first part of the St John Passion includes three commenting arias. There is an alto aria, "Von den Stricken meiner Sünden" (From the bonds of my sins). This includes an intertwined oboe line that brings back many characteristics of the opening chorus. Another aria is an enchanting flute and soprano duet, "Ich folge dir gleichfalls". In this piece the verbs "ziehen" (to pull) and "schieben" (to push) stimulate Bach's delight in musical illustration. The third aria is a passionate tenor solo that is accompanied by all the instruments, "Ach, mein Sinn" (O my soul).
 the death of Jesus: "Es ist vollbracht! ..." ("It is accomplished; what comfort for suffering human souls! I can see the end of the night of sorrow. The hero from Judah ends his victorious fight. It is accomplished!"). The central part is essentially a viola da gamba solo and an alto aria. The theme is introduced by the viola da gamba gently accompanied by the basso continuo setting. Then comes the solo vocal interpretation.
 closing chorale: Ach Herr, lass dein lieb Engelein ... (O Lord, let your dear little angels ...). This chorale – with alternative lyrics – is still in regular use in the congregations. The beginning of the theme is a descending sequence, but in overall the theme is full of emotion as well. Singing this chorale standalone, however, does not sound as a closing chorale, except if it is sung at the end of a real ceremony.

Criticism 

The text Bach set to music has been criticized as anti-Semitic. This accusation is closely connected to a wider controversy regarding the tone of the New Testament's Gospel of John with regards to Judaism.

Lukas Foss, who came to the United States in 1937 as a Jewish refugee from Nazi Germany, changed the text from "Juden" to "Leute" (people) when he conducted performances of the work. This has been the trend of numerous mainline Christian denominations since the late 20th century as well, for instance, the Episcopal Church, when they read the gospel during Good Friday services. Michael Marissen's Lutheranism, Anti-Judaism, and Bach's 'St John's Passion'  examines the controversy in detail. He concludes that Bach's St John Passion and St Matthew Passion contain fewer statements derogatory toward Jews than many other contemporary musical settings of the Passion. He also noted that Bach used words for the commenting arias and hymns that tended to shift the blame for the death of Jesus from "the Jews" to the congregation of Christians.

See also 
 St John Passion discography

References

Notes

Sources

Further reading 
 Alfred Dürr. Johann Sebastian Bach, St John Passion: Genesis, Transmission, and Meaning. Oxford: Oxford University Press, 2000. .

 Markus Rathey. Johann Sebastian Bach's 'St John Passion' from 1725: A Liturgical Interpretation, Colloquium 4 (2007) Colloquium 4 (2007)

External links 
 St John Passion: performance by the Netherlands Bach Society (video and background information)
 St John Passion (1725 version): performance by the Netherlands Bach Society (video and background information)

St John Passion, text (in many languages), details, recordings, reviews, discussions – bach-cantatas.com
 Text and translation to English – emmanuelmusic.org

Passions and oratorios by Johann Sebastian Bach
1724 compositions